Brigadier-General Henry R Cook was an early British aviator and an officer in the Royal Artillery during World War I. He was the first Assistant Commandant of the Central Flying School in the years before the war.

Early military career
In 1892, Cook who was a captain, was appointed adjutant of the Cork Artillery (Southern Division) in Ireland. He continued at Cork until 1897. In 1901 Cook was attached to the Jubaland Force as an interpreter with responsibility for mapping and as an intelligence officer. He took part in the Ogaden Punitive Expedition of 1901.

In September 1901 he was promoted to major. Ten years later, in December 1911, Cook was promoted to lieutenant colonel.

Aviation
Cook joined the Aeronautical Society of Great Britain on 14 December 1909. He was one of the first people in England to learn to fly, taking lessons in 1910 and gaining his Royal Aero Club aviator's certificate (number 42) at Beaulieu on 31 December 1910. Following the creation of the Royal Flying Corps (RFC) in May 1912, Cook was seconded from the Royal Artillery to the RFC's Central Flying School (CFS) as an instructor in theory and construction. After the Commandant, Captain Godfrey Paine RN, Cook was next most senior officer at the School and by August he was being described as the Assistant Commandant. While at the CFS, Cook was involved in teaching theory. In September 1912 he was awarded a Royal Aero Club Special Certificate for carrying out a series flights and aerial manoeuvres which were of special merit in the early years of aviation. In December 1912, Cook spent some time in India, visiting Agra where he made observations on the ability of birds to soar and theorized on the effect of sunlight on air.

World War I
On 23 June 1913, Cook returned to the Royal Garrison Artillery and was placed on the RFC's reserve list. He served throughout World War I, retiring on 14 September 1919 as a substantive colonel with the honorary rank of brigadier-general.

References

|-

Royal Artillery officers
Royal Flying Corps officers
British Army generals of World War I
Year of death missing
Year of birth missing